Theodor Kolde (6 May 1850 – 21 October 1913) was a German Protestant theologian, born at Friedland in Silesia.

Biography 
He studied at the universities in Breslau and Leipzig. In 1876 he commenced lecturing on theology at the University of Marburg, where he became professor extraordinarius in 1879. In 1881 he was appointed professor of church history at the University of Erlangen.

Published works 
He edited the Beiträge zur bayerischen Kirchengeschichte (20 volumes, 1895–1913) and Die Universität unter dem Hause Wittelsbach, 1810-1910 (1910). His principal publications include:  
 Luthers Stellung zu Konzil und Kirche bis zum Wormser Reichstag (1876)  
 Die deutsche Augustinerkongregation und Johann von Staupitz (1879)  
 Friedrich der Weise und die Anfänge der Reformation (1881)  
 Martin Luther: Eine Biographie (1884–93)  
 Die Heilsarmee nach eigener Anschauung und nach ihren Schriften (1885)  
 Der Methodismus und seine Bekämpfung (1886)  
 Luthers Selbstmord: Eine Geschichtslüge Majunkes (third edition, 1890)  
 Ueber Grenzen des historischen Erkennens (1890)  
 Die kirchlichen Bruderschaften und das religiöse Leben im modernen Katholizismus (1895)  
 Die Augsburgische Konfession, lateinisch und deutsch, kurz erläutert (1896; second edition, 1911)  
 Das religiöse Leben in Erfurt beim Ausgange des Mittelalters (1898)  
 Die Heilsarmee, ihre Geschichte und ihr Wesen (1899)  
 Der Katholizismus und das 20.  Jahrhundert, kritische Betrachtungen (1903)  
 Der Staatsgedanke der Reformation und die römische Kirche (1903)  
 Die Anfänge einer katholischen Gemeinde in Erlangen (1906)  
 Historische Einleitung in die symbolischen Bücher der evangelisch-lutherischen Kirche (1907; third edition, 1913)

References 

 

19th-century German Protestant theologians
20th-century German Protestant theologians
German biographers
Male biographers
1850 births
1913 deaths
People from Nysa County
Academic staff of the University of Erlangen-Nuremberg
Academic staff of the University of Marburg
20th-century biographers
19th-century German male writers
19th-century German writers
20th-century German male writers
German male non-fiction writers